Lipce Reymontowskie  (until 1983 Lipce) is a village in Skierniewice County, Łódź Voivodeship, in central Poland. It is the seat of the gmina (administrative district) called Gmina Lipce Reymontowskie.

The village has a population of 1,200.

Polish novelist Władysław Stanisław Reymont placed the plot of his novel The Peasants in the village of Lipce.

References

Villages in Skierniewice County